SC Kriens Frauen is a Swiss women's football club from Kriens representing SC Kriens in the Frauen Nationalliga A. It was founded as SK Root. The team has been active in the Swiss women's leagues since at least 1985.

Root appeared for the first time in the Nationalliga A in 2000 and 2002, but it wasn't able to avoid relegation both times. Its third appearance in 2008 marked its first successful campaign in the category. Following the end of the season Root became Kriens' women's team, with Root's former farm team representing the former club in the lower categories. It has since established itself in the NLA with 4th, 5th and 6th spots in the next three seasons.

In 2012 the team finished runners-up to Zürich.

For the 2014/15 season three teams of SC Kriens joined FC Luzern Frauen. They were a team in the Nationalliga A, and Under-18 and U-16 youth teams. The merger was agreed on to join forces in the central Switzerland region.

2011-12 squad

References

Women's football clubs in Switzerland
Women
Association football clubs established in 2008
2008 establishments in Switzerland